Boghrati Rural District is a rural district (dehestan) in Sardrud District, Razan County, Hamadan Province, Iran. At the 2006 census, its population was 15,824, in 3,402 families. The rural district has 14 villages.

References 

Rural Districts of Hamadan Province
Razan County